Sam Woo Restaurant (三和) is a restaurant chain that serves Hong Kong-style cuisine. It has many locations in predominantly overseas Chinese communities of Southern California, in Las Vegas, and in the suburbs of Toronto. "Sam Woo" is a romanization of the Cantonese pronunciation for "triple harmonies," in reference to feng shui principles, including the synthesis of heaven, earth, and humanity.  The complete Chinese name (三和燒臘麵家) would translate literally into English as "Three Harmonies Roast Meats and Noodle House."

History

The first delicatessen was opened in 1979 by an elderly immigrant from Hong Kong in the Los Angeles Chinatown and later spread to other locations in California, including Monterey Park and Alhambra.  The first Sam Woo has since relocated to a newer building within Chinatown to include a restaurant and delicatessen.

Two other locations in the San Gabriel Valley opened only to later change hands or close. One restaurant opened in Montebello, which was renamed to "A-1" (now closed) when an employee purchased it from the Sam Woo owners (though the menu remains the same).  In 2004 a Sam Woo also opened in the suburb of Covina, California, but it failed the following year and was replaced by a similar family-style restaurant.

There are two types of Sam Woo restaurants. The first is aptly named Sam Woo BBQ Restaurant (香港三和燒臘麵家; Pinyin: Xiānggǎng Sānhé Shāolà Miànjiā, Cantonese: hoeng1 gong2 saam1 wo4 siu1 laap6 min6 gaa1).

The restaurant chain operates in suburban areas in Southern California, mostly in communities where there are many immigrants from China and Taiwan, such as San Gabriel, Rowland Heights, and Irvine. Several, but not all, Sam Woo Restaurants in Southern California are located in shopping centers anchored by 99 Ranch Market stores. The popular Sam Woo BBQ Restaurant as well as the anchor tenant 99 Ranch Market has contributed to the development of the spectacular Chinatown, Las Vegas.

Sam Woo Restaurants are generally popular even though long waits to be seated are common.

In 1992, presidential candidate Bill Clinton held a fundraiser at a now-defunct Sam Woo Seafood Restaurant in San Gabriel, California. The restaurant was highly popular for its dim sum. However, in 2003, the restaurant received some less favorable media attention when it and surrounding Chinese businesses in San Gabriel were at the center of the SARS panic. Due to an unsubstantiated internet rumor, customer patronage declined and the restaurant closed.  Unlike in Hong Kong or Toronto, there was no actual verified case of SARS reported in San Gabriel or Los Angeles.

In Southern California, hoping to capitalize on the success of Sam Woo Restaurants, restaurateurs have opened imitations with similar names in English and Chinese.  Examples include the long-gone Sam Doo Restaurant in San Gabriel and the current S.W. Seafood Restaurant in Irvine.  In the early 1990s, a similar concept to Sam Woo Restaurant, the now-defunct Luk Yue Restaurant, also started in Chinatown (LA) and like Sam Woo, it expanded into the Chinese community of Monterey Park, California, Rowland Heights, and Cerritos, California.  The chain has since folded while Sam Woo Restaurant remains popular in the Chinese communities of Southern California and Toronto.

There was a popular multistory Chinese restaurant in Chinatown, San Francisco called Sam Wo.  Despite having a similar name and foods, it is not part of the chain in Southern California and should not be confused with it.

Locations

Canada

Ontario
Greater Toronto Area: one location in Toronto (Scarborough)

United States

California
Costa Mesa (Seafood - defunct)
Irvine (BBQ and Seafood) - closed as of 13 December 2021
Los Angeles County 
 Freestanding - Chinatown, Los Angeles (original BBQ and Seafood closed - relocated BBQ still open)
 Van Nuys (BBQ)
 San Gabriel (BBQ-In Focus Plaza) Closed as of 12/1/2020
 San Gabriel (BBQ-168 Market)
 Rowland Heights (BBQ deli is open, Seafood restaurant closed around December 2006
Closed sep 2021 )
 Covina - (BBQ - defunct)
 Cerritos  (BBQ and Seafood)
 Garvey Plaza - Monterey Park (BBQ defunct)
 Freestanding - Alhambra (BBQ)
Rosemead (BBQ)
San Diego (BBQ)

Nevada
Chinatown Plaza - Las Vegas (Chinatown, Las Vegas)

See also

 List of Chinese restaurants
 List of seafood restaurants

References

External links
 Irvine Sam Woo Restaurant Seafood & BBQ Express is the official website of one of the restaurants.

Hong Kong-American culture
Restaurant chains in the United States
Companies based in Los Angeles County, California
Restaurants in Los Angeles
Chinese-American culture in California
Chinese restaurants outside China
Restaurants established in 1979
Chinatown, Los Angeles
Seafood restaurants
1979 establishments in California
Noodle restaurants